Cornborough may refer to:

 Cornborough railway station, North Devon, England
 Vickii Cornborough (born 1990), English rugby union player